Bheem Prasad Sonkar was an Indian politician and a member of the 16th Legislative Assembly of Uttar Pradesh of India. He represented the Alapur constituency of Uttar Pradesh and was a member of the Samajwadi Party. Sonkar died on 23 February 2021 while undergoing treatment at Azamgarh District Hospital.  He was suffering from a fatal disease.

Early life and education
Bheem Prasad Sonkar was born in Rajesultanpur, Uttar Pradesh. He held a Bachelor's degree.

Political career
Bheem Prasad Sonkar has been a MLA for one term. He represented the Alapur constituency and was a member of the Samajwadi Party.

Posts held

See also
Alapur
Rajesultanpur
Politics of India
Sixteenth Legislative Assembly of Uttar Pradesh
Uttar Pradesh Legislative Assembly

References 

1956 births
Living people
People from Sant Kabir Nagar district
Samajwadi Party politicians
Uttar Pradesh MLAs 2012–2017